Togara Muzanenhamo (born 1975) is a Zimbabwean poet born in Lusaka, Zambia, to Zimbabwean parents. He attended St George's College, Harare. He studied in France and the Netherlands. After his studies he returned to Zimbabwe and worked as a journalist, then moved to an institute dedicated to the development of African screenplays. Muzanenhamo's first collection of poems, Spirit Brides, was published by Carcanet Press in 2006.

References

Living people
1975 births
People from Lusaka
Zimbabwean poets
Zimbabwean male writers
Male poets
Alumni of St. George's College, Harare